Zigby the zebra is an anthropomorphic children's fictional character created by Scottish-born English author Brian Paterson. Zigby appears in a series of picture books and board books as well as in a 3D-animated television adaptation. It aired on Treehouse TV from 2009 to 2011 (with repeats from 2013 to 2015) in Canada and was previously aired on CBeebies in the UK from 2009 to 2014.

Zigby lives in a treehouse in Mudwater Creek, on a lush tropical island. In a typical book or episode, the enthusiastic zebra "trots into trouble" through his slightly eccentric behaviour. He is followed by his friends McMeer the meerkat and Bertie Bird the anxious guinea fowl.

Books 
The following picture books for ages approximately 2–5 were published by HarperCollins:
 Zigby Camps Out (2002)
 Zigby Hunts for Treasure (2002)
 Zigby and the Ant Invaders (2003)
 Zigby Dives In (2003)

 Zigby and the Monster (2005)

Four board books (Go-Kart, The Picnic, The Birthday Party, Toy Box) appeared in 2004 with the same publisher. As of early 2005, 350,000 copies had been sold in fifteen countries.

Television adaptation
The development of an animated series based on the character was announced in 2005. 52 3D-animated episodes of 11 minutes each were co-produced by companies in Australia, Singapore, and Canada. It was also acquired by German ZDF, BBC-owned CBeebies and by France 5 also Univision's Planeta U (dubbed in Spanish) in America. In Canada, it aired on Treehouse TV from February 23, 2009 to July 31, 2011 (with repeats from June 2013 to May 2015). In the UK, it aired on CBeebies from 2009 to 2014. In Australia, it aired on ABC from March 25, 2009 to January 3, 2015. The series specifically targets 4 to 5 year olds with a wider target audience of 3 to 6 year olds.

The show was cancelled due to poor ratings.

References

External links 
 
 Zigby  at Treehouse TV
 Zigby at IMDb

2000s Australian animated television series
2010s Australian animated television series
2000s Canadian animated television series
2010s Canadian animated television series
2009 Australian television series debuts
2013 Australian television series endings
2009 Canadian television series debuts
2013 Canadian television series endings
Australian children's animated adventure television series
Australian children's animated comedy television series
Australian computer-animated television series
Australian preschool education television series
Australian television shows based on children's books
Canadian computer-animated television series
Canadian children's animated adventure television series
Canadian children's animated comedy television series
Canadian preschool education television series
Canadian television shows based on children's books
Animated preschool education television series
2000s preschool education television series
2010s preschool education television series
Treehouse TV original programming
British picture books
Fictional zebras
Fictional mongooses
Fictional chameleons and geckos
Fictional hippopotamuses
Animated television series about birds
Animated television series about lions
Animated television series about monkeys
Animated television series about elephants
Television series by Corus Entertainment
CBeebies
English-language television shows
Singaporean animated television series